Belfast Windsor was a constituency of the Parliament of Northern Ireland.

Boundaries
Belfast Windsor was a borough constituency comprising part of southern Belfast.  It was created in 1929 when the House of Commons (Method of Voting and Redistribution of Seats) Act (Northern Ireland) 1929 introduced first past the post elections throughout Northern Ireland.

Belfast Windsor was created by the division of Belfast South into four new constituencies.  It survived unchanged, returning one member of Parliament, until the Parliament of Northern Ireland was temporarily suspended in 1972, and then formally abolished in 1973.

Politics
In common with other seats in south Belfast, the constituency was strongly unionist. The seat was always held by official Unionist candidates, and the rare contests came only from other Unionists.

Members of Parliament

Elections results

At the General Election 30 November 1933, Hugh Pollock was elected unopposed.  At the 1937 Belfast Windsor by-election, William Dowling was elected unopposed.

At the 1949 and 1953 Northern Ireland general elections, Archibald Wilson was elected unopposed.

At the 1956 Belfast Windsor by-election and the 1958, 1962, 1965 and 1969 Northern Ireland general elections, Herbert Kirk was elected unopposed.

References

Windsor
Northern Ireland Parliament constituencies established in 1929
Northern Ireland Parliament constituencies disestablished in 1973